Shengtou Power Station or Shentou power station is a large coal-fired power station in China.

See also 

 List of coal power stations

External links 

 Shentou power station on Global Energy Monitor

References 

Coal-fired power stations in China